Giant lobelia is a common name for several plants in the genus Lobelia and may refer to:
Lobelia aberdarica
Lobelia bambuseti
Lobelia deckenii 
Lobelia giberroa
Lobelia gregoriana (syn. L. deckenii subsp. keniensis, L. keniensis)
Lobelia morogoroensis
Lobelia rhynchopetalum
Lobelia telekii

The giant lobelia span Africa, Hawaii, South America, French Polynesia, and Southeast Asia. Phylogenetic analysis strongly supports that this is a monophyletic group.

References

Lobelia